William Ray Svoboda (July 12, 1928 – June 20, 1980) was an American football linebacker who played nine seasons in the National Football League (NFL) for the Chicago Cardinals and New York Giants.  He played college football at Tulane University and was drafted in the third round of the 1950 NFL Draft.  Svoboda died after suffering a heart attack while jogging.

References

External links
 

1928 births
1980 deaths
American football linebackers
Chicago Cardinals players
New York Giants players
Tulane Green Wave football players
Eastern Conference Pro Bowl players
People from Bonham, Texas
People from Wichita Falls, Texas
Players of American football from Texas

American people of Czech descent